Khorshed Alam (January 15, 1935 – July 28, 2021) was the fifth governor of Bangladesh Bank, the central bank of Bangladesh during 1992–1996.
Alam has served as the chairman of the board of trustees of University of Asia Pacific. He was a UAP Foundation member and trustee member.

References

1935 births
2021 deaths
People from Narsingdi District
20th-century Bangladeshi economists
Governors of Bangladesh Bank